Te Tse (Ҵ ҵ; italics: Ҵ ҵ) is a letter of the Cyrillic script. The shape of the letter originated as a ligature of the Cyrillic letters Te (Т т Т т) and  Tse (Ц ц Ц ц).

Te Tse is  used in the Abkhaz alphabet, where it represents the alveolar ejective affricate . The letter is ordered between Ц and Ч.

Computing codes

See also
Cyrillic characters in Unicode

References

Cyrillic ligatures